Up and Down is the fourth studio album by Austrian pop rock band Opus. It was released in 1984 by the label OK Musica in Austria and the rest of the world by the label Polydor. The tracks released by Polydor are different from the original version. In Canada and United States, the song "Live is Life" was included, because the live album Live Is Life wasn't released in these countries. The single "Up and Down" charted at #65 on the Canadian music chart.

Track listing

Personnel
 Herwig Rüdisser – lead vocals
 Ewald Pfleger – guitars, backing vocals
 Kurt René Plisnier – keyboards
 Peter Niklas Gruber – bass, backing vocals
 Günter Grasmuck – drums, percussion
Additional touring personnel
 Günter Tsimischl – backing vocals, percussion
Additional studio musicians
 Karin Raab – vocals on "Vivian" and "The End of the Show"
 Christian Kolonovits – synclavier and arrangement on "She Loves You"

Chart positions

References

Opus (Austrian band) albums
1984 albums
Polydor Records albums